Unjapyx is a genus of diplurans in the family Japygidae.

Species
 Unjapyx clayae Pagés, 1978
 Unjapyx mussardi Pagés, 1993
 Unjapyx simplicior (Silvestri, 1929)
 Unjapyx turbator Pagés, 1993

References

Diplura